Acrolepiopsis japonica is a moth of the family Acrolepiidae. It was described by Reinhard Gaedike in 1982. It is found in Japan.

The larvae are borers in Dioscorea japonica.

References

Moths described in 1982
Acrolepiidae
Moths of Japan